Cihan Turkish given name of Persian origin meaning universe.

Given name
Cihan Alptekin (1947–1972), Turkish revolutionary and militant
Cihan Can, Turkish footballer
Cihan Haspolatlı, Turkish footballer
Cihan Kaptan, Turkish footballer
Cihan Özkara, Turkish-German footballer
Cihan Ünal, Turkish actor
Cihan Yılmaz, Turkish footballer

Surname 
Veysel Cihan, Turkish footballer

Other 
Cihan News Agency in Turkey

References

Turkish-language surnames
Turkish unisex given names